The Poor are an Australian hard rock band that formed in 1986 as The Poor Boys in Darwin, Northern Territory. Their founding mainstays are Julian "RV" Grynglas on guitar, Anthony "Skenie" Skene on vocals and rhythm guitar, and Matt Whitby on bass guitar. On 13 June 1994 they released a debut album, Who Cares, on the Sony label, which peaked at No. 3 on the ARIA Albums Chart. The lead single, "More Wine Waiter Please", had appeared in the United States in March and reached No. 30 on the Billboard Hot Mainstream Rock Tracks chart. It was a top ten hit in Australia when released there in May. The Poor disbanded in 2000 but reformed in 2008 and issued two further albums, Round 1 (October 2009) and Round 2 (15 October 2010), on Riot Entertainment.

History
The Poor Boys formed in 1986 in Darwin, Northern Territory. The original line-up was Mark Davis on drums, Chris Risdale on guitar, Anthony "Skenie" Skene on vocals and rhythm guitar, and Matt Whitby on bass guitar. Risdale and Skene had met in 1984 when they attended Dripstone High School together. They had met Davis and Whitby at parties in Darwin and soon were gigging together as a covers band. Risdale soon left when Reid joined. After Reid left Grynglas joined and they started to write their own material. Davis left a few years later.

In 1991 the group relocated to Sydney and later that year toured the United States supporting fellow Australian hard rockers, The Angels. By June 1992 James Young (ex-BB Steal) replaced Davis on drums and the group released their debut extended play, Rude, Crude & Tattooed, on Sony/Columbia Records. It was produced by The Angels' members Rick Brewster and Bob Spencer. The Poor Boys supported that group's national tour through July to August. About a year later The Poor Boys issued their second EP, Underfed, which was produced by Brent Eccles (also a member of The Angels). They followed in October by backing United States acts, Alice in Chains and Suicidal Tendencies, on the Australian leg of their combined tour.

In March 1994 The Poor Boys changed their name to The Poor to avoid confusion with a US group of the former name. That month they issued a single, "More Wine Waiter Please", in the US where it peaked at No. 30 on the Billboard Hot Mainstream Rock Tracks. In May they released it in Australia and it peaked at No. 10 on the ARIA Singles Chart. The Australian single's cover art featured a variant of the group's former logo, with the word "Boys" crossed out, to notify fans that it was the same band. On 13 June 1994 they followed with their debut studio album, Who Cares, which reached No. 3 on the ARIA Albums Chart. It was produced by United Kingdom's Paul Northfield (Suicidal Tendencies) and had been previously released in Japan on 8 April that year. Recorded in Sydney and Montreal it was also issued in the US. The Poor promoted their US releases with a tour there supporting German rockers, Scorpions. The Poor also toured Europe and Japan. In September 1994 their next single, "Poison", reached No. 48 in Australia.

Early in 1996 they opened for AC/DC's international tour. They also supported Kiss, and, in April 1998, Van Halen. In 1997 Young was replaced on drums by Gavin Hansen (ex-Rattlebone) – a friend of Whitby's. The group issued another single the following year, "Simple Livin'", intended to be the first single from the follow-up to Who Cares, however in 2000 The Poor disbanded. Various members of The Poor separated into two heavy rock groups, Lump and Blackseed. Skene related what happened after the split: "I did a small solo acoustic thing for a while. Matt was at Uni studying history. Julian was just working. Gav went back to Melbourne before moving to the Gold Coast where he grew up and started Lump with Melbourne mates Scotty and Stewie. Then I moved up and joined Lump as well!" "Simple Livin'" would later be released in 2012 on an expanded French CD version of Who Cares, collecting the B-sides from that album's singles.

The Poor reunited in April 2008 to play on an Australia tour with W.A.S.P. and soon after began recording a new album, Round 1, released in October 2009 by Riot!, comprised several older songs not previously released together with newly written tracks. Since October 2009 the group are based on the Gold Coast. In January 2010 they played at the Big Day Out on the Gold Coast. On 15 October 2010, the band released Round 2, Brian Fischer-Giffin of Loud Mag found that for this album "[The Poor] come out swinging much more convincingly, punching out a short, sharp album of no-nonsense hard rock that doesn't over stay its welcome or try to be anything more than it is. The Poor has got their mojo back".

In late 2022, the Poor announced the release of their fourth album (first in thirteen years), High Price Deed, on 2 February 2023. The album was preceded by singles "Payback's a Bitch", "Cry Out" and "Let Me Go". On 12 December, the fourth single "Take the World" was released.

Band members
Current members
 Daniel Cox – guitar (2019–present)
 Anthony "Skenie" Skene – vocals, rhythm guitar (1988–2000, 2008–present)
 Matt Whitby – bass guitar (1988–2000, 2008–present)
 Gavin Hansen – drums (1997–2000, 2008–present)

Former members
 Julian 'RV' Grynglas – guitar (1989–2000, 2008–2018)
 Mark Davis – drums (1986–1992)
 Chris Ridsdale – guitar (1986-1988)
 James Young – drums (1992–1997)
 Warren Reid -  guitar (1988–1989)
Justin Scott - guitar (1992-1997)

Timeline

Discography

Albums

Compilations 
 Round 1 & 2 (2011) – includes all songs from the albums Round 1 and Round 2

EPs

Singles

References

External links

 

Australian hard rock musical groups
Musical groups established in 1988
Musical groups disestablished in 2000
Musical groups reestablished in 2008
Northern Territory musical groups
550 Music artists